Massoud Circle is a major roundabout in Kabul, Afghanistan, named after Ahmad Shah Massoud. It is situated close to the Embassy of the United States, Kabul and has the road leading to Hamid Karzai International Airport. It is located in the eastern part of Wazir Akbar Khan.

References

Buildings and structures in Kabul
Squares in Asia
Roundabouts and traffic circles